Caupolicana is a genus of bees in the family Colletidae, native to the Americas; most species are crepuscular in habit, visiting flowers only at dawn and/or dusk. There are over 50 known species, in 4 subgenera (some of which have been historically treated as valid genera).

Subgenera and Species

Subgenus Alayoapis Michener, 1966
Caupolicana nigrescens (Cresson, 1869)
Caupolicana notabilis (Smith, 1861)
Caupolicana subaurata (Cresson, 1869)

Subgenus Caupolicana (s.s.)
Caupolicana adusta Friese, 1899
Caupolicana albiventris Friese, 1904
Caupolicana bicolor Friese, 1899
Caupolicana curvipes Friese, 1898
Caupolicana dimidiata Herbst, 1917
Caupolicana egregia Friese, 1906
Caupolicana electa (Cresson, 1878)
Caupolicana evansi Vergara and Michener, 2004
Caupolicana floridana Michener and Deyrup, 2004
Caupolicana friesei Jörgensen, 1909
Caupolicana fulvicollis Spinola, 1851
Caupolicana funebris Smith, 1879
Caupolicana gaullei Vachal, 1901
Caupolicana gayi Spinola, 1851
Caupolicana hirsuta Spinola, 1851
Caupolicana lugubris Smith, 1879
Caupolicana mendocina Jörgensen, 1909
Caupolicana mystica Schrottky, 1902
Caupolicana nigriventris Friese, 1904
Caupolicana niveofasciata Friese, 1898
Caupolicana ocellata Michener, 1966
Caupolicana ochracea (Friese, 1906)
Caupolicana peruviana Friese, 1900
Caupolicana piurensis Cockerell, 1911
Caupolicana pubescens Smith, 1879
Caupolicana quadrifasciata Friese, 1898
Caupolicana ruficollis Friese, 1906
Caupolicana smithiana Friese, 1908
Caupolicana specca Snelling, 1975
Caupolicana steinbachi Friese, 1906
Caupolicana vestita (Smith, 1879)
Caupolicana weyrauchi Moure, 1953
Caupolicana yarrowi (Cresson, 1875)

Subgenus Willinkapis Moure, 1953
Caupolicana chalybaea (Friese, 1906)
Caupolicana melanotricha (Moure, 1969)
Caupolicana perornata (Moure, 1969)

Subgenus Zikanapis Moure, 1945
Caupolicana brethesi (Compagnucci, 2006)
Caupolicana clypeata (Smith, 1879)
Caupolicana copo (Compagnucci, 2006)
Caupolicana elegans Timberlake, 1965
Caupolicana foersteri (Moure & Seabra, 1962)
Caupolicana funeraria (Moure, 1964)
Caupolicana inbio Michener, Engel & Ayala, 2003
Caupolicana megalopta (Moure, 1948)
Caupolicana modesta (Moure, 1964)
Caupolicana rozenorum Michener, Engel & Ayala, 2003
Caupolicana seabrai (Moure, 1953)
Caupolicana tucumana Moure, 1945
Caupolicana wileyi Michener & Engel, 2009
Caupolicana zikani (Friese, 1925)

References

External links 
 
 
 

Colletidae
Bee genera
Hymenoptera of North America
Hymenoptera of South America
Insects of Central America